Shanti Das (born February 19, 1971) is an American music industry executive, marketing consultant, entrepreneur, philanthropist and author. She was most recently Executive Vice President of Urban Marketing and Artist Development at Universal Motown Records, where she managed the marketing campaigns for artists such as Akon, Erykah Badu, and Ashanti.

Early life 
Das is of multiracial ancestry, being the daughter of a Bengali Hindu immigrant father originally from Kolkata, India and an African American mother native to Atlanta, Georgia. She suffered from a tragedy at an early age, when her father committed suicide when she was 7 months old, leaving her mother, Gloria, to take care of her and her two siblings alone. Her mother raised her Christian, which reflects in her even as an adult as she prays daily.

Career

1990s 
Das graduated from Atlanta's Benjamin Elijah Mays High School in 1989. She attended Syracuse University, where she majored in Television, Radio and Film in the S.I. Newhouse School of Communications. In the summers of 1991 and 1992, she worked her first record label job as an urban promotions assistant at Capitol Records. She briefly interned in the sales department at Sony Music Atlanta before graduating from Syracuse in 1993 with a bachelor of science degree in communications.

Right out of college, LaFace Records hired Das as its National Director of Promotions, where she worked with label founders Kenneth “Babyface” Edmonds and Antonio “LA” Reid on developing promotional campaigns for OutKast, Goodie Mob, Usher, TLC and Toni Braxton. She traveled with several artist tours, including Braxton’s first major U.S. concert tour (1993), TLC’s “CrazySexyCool” tour (1995-1996), and Usher’s 1994 and 1995 promotional tours.

In 1996, Das was promoted to LaFace’s marketing department, where she planned and coordinated campaigns for Outkast, Donell Jones, Goodie Mob and Toni Braxton. In 1997, she received Impact Magazine’s “National Promotion Director of the Year” award at its “Summer XII Conference.” A year later, Impact named her “Music Executive of the Year.”

2000s 
Upon the sale of LaFace Records to BMG in 2000, Das moved to New York and took on the role of Sr. Director of Urban Marketing at Arista Records, where L. A. Reid was then Arista’s new CEO. However, before leaving Atlanta, Outkast performed a free concert at Club Kaya in her honor. Das was awarded a “Key To The City of Atlanta” and June 5, 2000 was officially named “Shanti Das Day.”

Das left Arista in 2001 and became Vice President of Urban Marketing at Columbia Records. While at Columbia, she marketed high-profile projects for So So Def Records, Jagged Edge, Bow Wow and Jermaine Dupri. In 2003, she was elevated to Sr. Vice President of Urban Marketing at Sony Urban Music, where she developed and coordinated marketing and artist development campaigns for Prince, Vivian Green, Lyfe and Omarion.

In 2005, Das joined Universal Motown as Executive Vice President of Urban Marketing and Artist Development. From 2007-2009, she was co-President of 1st Class Entertainment and co-Founder of R&B Live New York, a monthly live music series that showcased urban talent from signed and unsigned artists.

Das recently completed the program, “Effective Strategies for Media Companies: Navigating the New World,” at the Harvard School of Business in Dec 2008.

Das was named to Crain Communications "40 Under 40" in 2009. Later that year, moved by the plight of those who either could not afford to bury their loved ones, she created May We Rest in Peace, a nonprofit organization to help bury bodies stacking up at Detroit's Wayne County Morgue.

Das left Universal Motown in 2009 and launched the company PressReset.me, an Atlanta-based firm that provides entertainment marketing consulting, talent booking, special event planning and life mentoring services. She is currently co-founder of the live music showcase, ATL LIVE on the Park, a southern version of Das' R&B Live showcase.

2010s 
In August 2010, Das wrote and published the book "The Hip-Hop Professional: A Woman’s Guide to Climbing the Ladder of Success in the Entertainment Business," which chronicles her 20-year career in the music industry.

Shanti is author of The Hip‐Hop Professional 2.0: A Woman’s Guide to Climbing the Ladder of Success in the Entertainment Business

Board affiliations 
Das sits on several boards and committees of organizations including:

 S. I. Newhouse School of Public Communications Advisory Board Member
 Bandier Music Program at Syracuse Advisory Board Member
 NARAS (NY Chapter) Urban Committee Member
 Apollo Theatre’s “Apollo Young Patrons” Committee Member
 Big Kidz Foundation Board Member

References 

1971 births
Businesspeople from Atlanta
S.I. Newhouse School of Public Communications alumni
American music industry executives
American people of Indian descent
Living people
Businesspeople from Kolkata
Businesswomen from West Bengal
21st-century American women